In computing, type introspection is the ability of a program to examine the type or properties of an object
at runtime.
Some programming languages possess this capability.

Introspection should not be confused with reflection, which goes a step further and is the ability for a program to manipulate the values, metadata, properties, and functions of an object at runtime.  Some programming languages also possess that capability  (e.g.,
Java,
Python,
Julia,
and
Go).

Examples

Ruby
Type introspection is a core feature of Ruby. In Ruby, the Object class (ancestor of every class) provides  and  methods for checking the instance's class. The latter returns true when the particular instance the message was sent to is an instance of a descendant of the class in question. For example, consider the following example code (you can immediately try this with the Interactive Ruby Shell):
$ irb
irb(main):001:0> A=Class.new
=> A
irb(main):002:0> B=Class.new A
=> B
irb(main):003:0> a=A.new
=> #<A:0x2e44b78>
irb(main):004:0> b=B.new
=> #<B:0x2e431b0>
irb(main):005:0> a.instance_of? A
=> true
irb(main):006:0> b.instance_of? A
=> false
irb(main):007:0> b.kind_of? A
=> true
In the example above, the  class is used as any other class in Ruby.

Further, you can directly ask for the class of any object, and "compare" them (code below assumes having executed the code above):
irb(main):008:0> A.instance_of? Class
=> true
irb(main):009:0> a.class
=> A
irb(main):010:0> a.class.class
=> Class
irb(main):011:0> A > B
=> true
irb(main):012:0> B <= A
=> true

Objective-C
In Objective-C, for example, both the generic Object and NSObject (in Cocoa/OpenStep) provide the method  which returns true if the argument to the method is an instance of the specified class. The method  analogously returns true if the argument inherits from the specified class.

Now, in the  method we can write
- (void)eat:(id)sth {
    if ([sth isKindOfClass:[Fruit class]]) {
        // we're actually eating a Fruit, so continue
        if ([sth isMemberOfClass:[Apple class]]) {
            eatApple(sth);
        } else if ([sth isMemberOfClass:[Orange class]]) {
            eatOrange(sth);
        } else {
            error();
        }
    } else {
        error();
    }
}

Now, when  is called with a generic object (an ), the function will behave correctly depending on the type of the generic object.

C++
C++ supports type introspection via the run-time type information (RTTI) typeid and dynamic_cast keywords.
The  expression can be used to determine whether a particular object is of a particular derived class. For instance:
Person* p = dynamic_cast<Person *>(obj);
if (p != nullptr) {
  p->walk();
}
The  operator retrieves a  object describing the most derived type of an object:
if (typeid(Person) == typeid(*obj)) {
  serialize_person( obj );
}

Object Pascal
Type introspection has been a part of Object Pascal since the original release of Delphi, which uses RTTI heavily for visual form design. In Object Pascal, all classes descend from the base TObject class, which implements basic RTTI functionality.  Every class's name can be referenced in code for RTTI purposes; the class name identifier is implemented as a pointer to the class's metadata, which can be declared and used as a variable of type TClass.
The language includes an is operator, to determine if an object is or descends from a given class, an as operator, providing a type-checked typecast, and several TObject methods. Deeper introspection (enumerating fields and methods) is traditionally only supported for objects declared in the $M+ (a pragma) state, typically TPersistent, and only for symbols defined in the published section. Delphi 2010 increased this to nearly all symbols.
procedure Form1.MyButtonOnClick(Sender: TObject);
var
   aButton: TButton;
   SenderClass: TClass;
begin
   SenderClass := Sender.ClassType; //returns Sender's class pointer
   if sender is TButton then
   begin
      aButton := sender as TButton;
      EditBox.Text := aButton.Caption; //Property that the button has but generic objects don't
   end
   else begin
      EditBox.Text := Sender.ClassName; //returns the name of Sender's class as a string
   end;
end;

Java
The simplest example of type introspection in Java is the  operator.  The  operator determines whether a particular object belongs to a particular class (or a subclass of that class, or a class that implements that interface).  For instance:
if (obj instanceof Person) {
    Person p = (Person)obj;
    p.walk();
}

The  class is the basis of more advanced introspection.

For instance, if it is desirable to determine the actual class of an object (rather than whether it is a member of a particular class),  and  can be used:

System.out.println(obj.getClass().getName());

PHP
In PHP introspection can be done using  operator. For instance:
if ($obj instanceof Person) {
    // Do whatever you want
}

Perl

We can introspect the following classes and their corresponding instances:
package Animal;
sub new {
    my $class = shift;
    return bless {}, $class;
}

package Dog;
use base 'Animal';

package main;
my $animal = Animal->new();
my $dog = Dog->new();
using:
print "This is an Animal.\n" if ref $animal eq 'Animal';
print "Dog is an Animal.\n" if $dog->isa('Animal');

Meta-Object Protocol

Much more powerful introspection in Perl can be achieved using the Moose object system and the  meta-object protocol; for example, you can check if a given object does a role :
if ($object->meta->does_role("X")) {
    # do something ...
}

This is how you can list fully qualified names of all of the methods that can be invoked on the object, together with the classes in which they were defined:

for my $method ($object->meta->get_all_methods) {
    print $method->fully_qualified_name, "\n";
}

Python
The most common method of introspection in Python is using the  function to detail the attributes of an object. For example:
class Foo:
    def __init__(self, val):
        self.x = val

    def bar(self):
        return self.x

>>> dir(Foo(5))
['__class__', '__delattr__', '__dict__', '__doc__', '__getattribute__',
'__hash__', '__init__', '__module__', '__new__', '__reduce__', '__reduce_ex__',
'__repr__', '__setattr__', '__str__', '__weakref__', 'bar', 'x']

Also, the built-in functions  and  can be used to determine what an object is while  can determine what an object does. For example:

>>> a = Foo(10)
>>> b = Bar(11)
>>> type(a)
<type 'Foo'>
>>> isinstance(a, Foo)
True
>>> isinstance(a, type(a))
True
>>> isinstance(a, type(b))
False
>>> hasattr(a, 'bar')
True

ActionScript (as3)
In ActionScript, the function flash.utils.getQualifiedClassName can be used to retrieve the class/type name of an arbitrary object.
// all classes used in as3 must be imported explicitly
import flash.utils.getQualifiedClassName;
import flash.display.Sprite;
// trace is like System.out.println in Java or echo in PHP
trace(flash.utils.getQualifiedClassName("I'm a String")); // "String"
trace(flash.utils.getQualifiedClassName(1)); // "int", see dynamic casting for why not Number
trace(flash.utils.getQualifiedClassName(new flash.display.Sprite())); // "flash.display.Sprite"

Alternatively, the operator is can be used to determine if an object is of a specific type:
// trace is like System.out.println in Java or echo in PHP
trace("I'm a String" is String); // true
trace(1 is String); // false
trace("I'm a String" is Number); // false
trace(1 is Number); // true

This second function can be used to test class inheritance parents as well:
import flash.display.DisplayObject;
import flash.display.Sprite; // extends DisplayObject

trace(new flash.display.Sprite() is flash.display.Sprite); // true
trace(new flash.display.Sprite() is flash.display.DisplayObject); // true, because Sprite extends DisplayObject
trace(new flash.display.Sprite() is String); // false

Meta-Type introspection
Like Perl, ActionScript can go further than getting the class name, but all the metadata, functions and other elements that make up an object using the flash.utils.describeType function; this is used when implementing reflection in ActionScript.
import flash.utils.describeType;
import flash.utils.getDefinitionByName;
import flash.utils.getQualifiedClassName;
import flash.display.Sprite;

var className:String = getQualifiedClassName(new flash.display.Sprite()); // "flash.display.Sprite"
var classRef:Class = getDefinitionByName(className); // Class reference to flash.display{{Not a typo|.}}Sprite
// eg. 'new classRef()' same as 'new  flash.display.Sprite()'
trace(describeType(classRef)); // return XML object describing type
// same as : trace(describeType(flash.display.Sprite));

See also 
 Reification (computer science)
 typeof

References

External links
Introspection on Rosetta Code

Object-oriented programming
Articles with example C++ code

fr:Introspection (informatique)